Asphalt 8: Airborne is a 2013 racing video game developed by ExoticBikes and Gameloft Barcelona and published by Gameloft. It is the tenth major game of Asphalt series. It was released on August 22, 2013, for iOS and Android, November 13 for Windows 8 and Windows Phone 8, January 15, 2014 for BlackBerry 10,  and April 5, 2015, for Tizen. Its successor, Asphalt 9: Legends was announced on February 26, 2018. The game has about 470 million players, according to the game description in the App Store.

Gameplay
Gameplay is similar to that of Asphalt 7: Heat, with the player given four control options: "Tilt to steer" (auto-acceleration with movement controlled by tilting the device), "Tilt and icons" (manual acceleration via an on-screen icon, with movement controlled by tilting the device), "On-screen controls" (auto-acceleration with movement controlled by an on-screen virtual steering-wheel), "Tap to steer" (auto-acceleration with movement controlled by tapping the side of the screen). The Windows 8.1 and Windows 10 versions feature different control schemes, including the traditional WASD and the up, down, left, right keyboard scheme.

The five star rating system for each race and the use of primary and secondary objectives introduced in Asphalt 6: Adrenaline that have been also used in Asphalt 7 have all been retained in Asphalt 8. Three stars are awarded for finishing in first place, two for second, and one for third. Achieving secondary objectives, such as performing a given number of stunts or knocking down opponents, awards the player with two additional stars. This is the same in Moto Blitz and Championships but you have to complete the primary objectives before unlocking the secondary objectives. Obtaining stars in an event is cumulative – players who finished first in an event without completing the secondary objectives may replay the race and obtain a five-star rating even if the primary objectives are not met. The core gameplay is slightly different, however. As the subtitle implies, the focus of Airborne is on jumping, with tracks featuring a lot more ramps than in previous games. In addition to performing standard jumps, the player can also perform flat spins (by drifting onto a ramp) and barrel rolls (by driving off of a curved ramp). It is also possible to perform a barrel roll by driving with half the car on a normal ramp. All jumps earn nitro boost; the longer the airtime, the more boost earned. Destroying obstacles such as barriers and lamp posts, hitting traffic cars, or almost hitting traffic cars (near misses) also earns nitros. Another new feature, which substitutes the "Adrenaline mode" in Asphalt 6 and 7, is the ability to perform a "Perfect Nitro". When the player hits boost, a small red zone appears in the boost bar. If the player hits boost again when the boost meter is in the red zone, the car will accelerate even faster, with the boost lasting until the player runs out of boost, brakes, crashes or hits a ramp.

In the initial version of the game, the career mode consisted of 180 events split into eight "seasons", which become progressively more difficult. In later versions, additional challenges and seasons were added. As of March 2020, Asphalt developed a total of nine seasons, excluding the "McLaren Legends Season". When the game begins, only Season One is available. Later seasons must be unlocked either by earning a certain number of stars or by purchasing a "Season Unlock" in the in-app store. You cannot unlock a season through an in-app purchase unless you have played and earned the required amount of stars to unlock the previous season or purchased the previous season. The Great Wall update added 30 new events centered on the Great Wall of China. The Dubai update introduced a new season where only fully upgraded cars are eligible to participate, besides adding three new events centered on Dubai. The San Diego Harbor update introduced a new season featuring events where the player can participate in a twenty-four car race (Exclusive Metal Events – only on iOS 8), alongside several new events centered on both Dubai and the San Diego Harbor.

Asphalt 8 is the first game in the Asphalt series to use Game Center for achievements rather than Gameloft's own Gameloft Live. The April 2015 update added support for the Apple Watch and made it compatible only on the iPhone 5 or later models using iOS 8.2 or later through the use of Bluetooth or Wi-Fi. The October 2015 update added support for the Apple TV.

Online multiplayer mode can be played both locally via Wi-Fi, and globally via the internet. There is also a "World Series" online multiplayer mode, although this mode is unavailable on iPod touch 4th generation and iPhone 4. Playing on multiplayer is the only way to increase a player's in-game level, to which more credits are awarded as the player levels up. The Multiplayer League Update in October 2016 introduced a revamped multiplayer gameplay in the form of the "Multiplayer League", where players compete against each other in online multiplayer races to win exclusive rewards.

Vehicles
Asphalt 8: Airborne currently has more than 343 vehicles, including 11 vehicles that were removed or are no longer obtainable. The player starts with the lowest car, the Dodge Dart GT. The list includes SUVs such as Ford F-150, supercars like Lamborghini Centenario LP770-4 and Koenigsegg Jesko, Formula One cars and fictional vehicles such as Gru's vehicle from Despicable Me series. Since an update in August 2017, the game also features motorcycles, the first time since Asphalt 6: Adrenaline. Unlike previous Asphalt games, the player no longer needs to obtain stars to unlock them; instead they are available from the very start and bought by using credits, which can be also used to upgrade them.

Asphalt 8 offers a wide range of autos, including more than 300 high-performance cars from well-known international manufacturers. The car collection includes imaginary and concept models in addition to numerous different classes and types of vehicles. This wide selection of vehicles has something for every racing enthusiast, from drifting to flying through the air.

Soundtrack

Asphalt 8 is the first game in the series to feature a licensed soundtrack. When playing the game, there are three selectable "stations": bass, rock, and electronic. The March 2014 update also added four new songs. In 2021, some songs were removed and replaced by new songs and the rock station was removed.

Reception

Asphalt 8 received critical acclaim from critics and became the leading game of its genre. The iOS version holds an aggregate score of 91 out of 100 on Metacritic based on 18 reviews.

TouchArcade Eric Ford gave the game a perfect score, 5 out of 5, calling it the "pinnacle" of the Asphalt series. He was particularly impressed with the new jump-focused gameplay and the graphics, arguing that "the graphics engine does a great job of imparting that sense of speed that is essential for a game that thrives on fast gameplay". His only criticism was what he perceived as a disparity between the price of some of the cars and the reward money given to the play; "as you get towards the really expensive cars, you'll notice that you don't earn quite as much money proportionally to afford what you might want." However, he saw this as a "minor complaint" and concluded by saying "the iOS platform has quietly become a haven for great racers, and Asphalt 8 looks to be leading the pack right now." AppSpy James Gilmour also gave the game 5 out of 5, praising the controls, the range of tracks, cars and upgrades. He argued that "Asphalt 8: Airborne plays like a greatest hits compilation of arcade racers. Perhaps you enjoyed the powerslide from Out Run and Ridge Racer? Or the nitro boosts and takedown challenges from Burnout? Well, you'll find them all in Asphalt 8. The good news is that rather than Gameloft simply ripping off aspects of other games and mashing them randomly together, the dev has managed create a polished, adrenaline-infused racer which is way more fun than it has any right to be [...] Though Asphalt 8: Airbornes parts may be borrowed, they have been skilfully assembled to build a highly entertaining vehicle." MacLifes Andrew Hayward also awarded a perfect 5 out of 5 score, feeling the game reverses the sense of stagnation which had crept into the Asphalt series by the time of Asphalt 7, and arguing that it "essentially feels like a reboot in terms of quality. It's actually a rather amazing feat". He compared the game to Real Racing 3, praising Asphalt 8 for featuring a "real" multiplayer mode. He concluded that "what began life as a passable mobile diversion nearly a decade ago has finally blossomed into a racing experience that's frantic, hearty, and really rather impressive throughout. Asphalt 8: Airborne blurs the line between mobile and console racers, with an amazing asking price to boot, and it's easily the best racer of its kind on the App Store today."

Andrew Stevens of 148Apps scored the game 4.5 out of 5, arguing that it takes the Asphalt series "to a new height." He too praised the new jump-focused gameplay; "I've always had great fun with arcade racers and enjoyed the previous Asphalt entries, but something as simple as adding ramps and a few stunts to the action has really taken this series in a new direction." He concluded that "Asphalt 8: Airborne is a great addition to the series and arcade racing fans will find themselves very happy with its offerings." Gamezebo's David Oxford also awarded a score of 4.5 out of 5, praising the new jump-focused gameplay, the graphics, the range of cars, the level design and the use of licensed music. Although, he was critical of the drifting mechanics, he concluded that "Asphalt 8: Airbornes numerous features and modes, including multiplayer, help round out this package.  It's an easy recommendation for anyone who likes their racers a little more realistic than a cartoon kart racer, but with a healthy dose of over-the-top arcade action."

Pocket Gamer scored the game 9 out of 10, also giving it a "Gold Award". Reviewer Harry Slater compared the game to Real Racing 3, arguing "If Real Racing 3 is a precision instrument, then Asphalt 8: Airborne is a lump hammer  [...] there's a simple arcade glory to the proceedings, which leaves you with a smile on your face after every breathtaking dash to the line. So while Asphalt 8: Airborne might not be subtle, every second you spend in its company is exhilarating fun." He praised the level design, control options, the nitro system, and the use of shortcuts on every track. He concluded that "Asphalt 8: Airborne might not be the best-looking racer out there, and it certainly isn't the most realistic, but as an arcade blast it's hard to top. Its powerslides are that bit madder, its jumps that bit more ludicrous, and its takedowns that more satisfying than its nearest competitors. This is a racer that concentrates on fun above anything else, and it hits its mark almost every time. If you're a fan of gaming with a grin on your face, then Asphalt 8: Airborne is going to be right up your street."

IGN Steve Watts was less impressed, scoring the game 7.8 out of 10. Although he praised the graphics and gameplay, he was critical of the in-app purchase system; "By the time I reached the mid-point, the hodgepodge of car requirements felt like an unworkable maze. I constantly needed more stars, but by that point progression required me to spend a large wad of cash on a car that might only be useful for one event. I would begrudgingly buy it, earn the five stars available in that event, and then go looking for another that could slowly inch me towards the next season. Of course, Asphalt is more than happy to remind you that you can simply purchase some cars or in-game currency to speed up the process." He concluded that "Asphalt 8: Airborne is a highly polished racer with loads of content, but its pacing is slowed by aggressive gating that pushes too hard toward its in-app purchases. The later season requirements are too intrusive and the grind starts to wear thin after a while."

Asphalt 8+ 
Asphalt 8+ is a premium version of the game which is only available with an Apple Arcade. The game is based upon an older build of the game, featuring the older garage layout, missing certain cars, and including the now removed Mastery system. The biggest change within the game, however, is the lack of microtransactions in the game. Players are also able to unlock and fully upgrade every vehicle in the game simply by playing, something not possible in the regular game, with vehicles such as the McLaren Speedtail being a paid car.

Bans 

Asphalt 8: Airborne uses the anti-cheat to detect any uses of hacks, bots, mods, exploits and any software that interfering the gameplay which will leads to following ban period:

When the player is banned for the first time, their account cannot be used and the game may not be played for certain days including penalties such as all the scores removed from the leaderboard and having all the progress reset to zero after the ban expires.

If the player is banned for the second time, their account will be banned permanently and will be no longer usable.

Notes

References

2013 video games
Android (operating system) games
Asphalt (series)
BlackBerry games
Free-to-play video games
Gameloft games
IOS games
Motorcycle video games
Multiplayer and single-player video games
Universal Windows Platform apps
Video games developed in Spain
Video games set in Argentina
Video games set in Bermuda
Video games set in Brazil
Video games set in China
Video games set in Dubai
Video games set in France
Video games set in Germany
Video games set in Iceland
Video games set in London
Video games set in Monaco
Video games set in Nevada
Video games set in outer space
Video games set in Tokyo
Video games set in San Diego
Video games set in South America
Video games set in Spain
Video games set in Transylvania
Video games set in Venice
Video games set on the Moon
Video games with downloadable content
Windows games
Windows Phone games